Rachel Lowe may refer to:

Rachel Lowe (born 1977), English board game developer 
Rachel Lowe (artist) (born 1968), British artist and filmmaker
Rachel Lowe (soccer) (born 19 November 2000), Australian soccer player